Subhash Uttam Phal Desai is an Indian politician. He is currently serving as a Minister of Social Welfare, River Navigation, Archives and Archeology in Government of Goa.He was also Ex-Deputy Speaker of Goa Legislative Assembly and Member of Legislative assembly from Sanguem. He also served as a Vice-Chairman of Entertainment Society of Goa (ESG), who also jointly conduct International Film Festival of India (IFFI) with Ministry of Information and Broadcasting, Government of India. He is the member of the Bharatiya Janata Party.

References

1966 births
Living people
Goa MLAs 2022–2027
People from South Goa district
Goa MLAs 2012–2017
Bharatiya Janata Party politicians from Goa